Panlong District is one of seven districts of the prefecture-level city of Kunming, the capital of Yunnan Province, Southwest China.

Administrative divisions
Tuodong, Gulou, Donghua, Lianmeng, Jinchen, Qingyun, Ciba and Longquan Sub-district Offices, Shuanglong Village and Songhua Village

Demography
Panlong District stretches from Kunming's downtown area to the city's northern ring road. Recent boundary changes to accommodate the city's rapid growth have left the district with a population of around 700,000 people (as of 2006). Slightly more than half of them are permanent residents; 160,000 are rural migrants registered with the authorities as temporary residents, and a further 160,000 or so are ‘floating’ migrants with no formal registration in the locality. The migrants come from Yunnan's rural areas, as well as from Sichuan, Jiangsu, Hebei, Xinjiang and Guizhou.

References

External links 
 Panlong District Official Website

County-level divisions of Kunming